Stevens Rock is a small, lone bare rock  east of Strahan Glacier and  off the coast of Antarctica. Discovered in February 1931 by the British Australian New Zealand Antarctic Research Expedition (BANZARE) under Mawson, who named it for Commander C.W. Stevens, Hydrographic Dept., Royal Australian Navy.

Rock formations of Mac. Robertson Land
Coasts of Antarctica